MHSC may refer to:

 Soto Cano Air Base, a Honduran military base
 Montpellier HSC, a French soccer club
 Master of Health Science, an academic degree
 Monipur High School and College, Dhaka, Bangladesh 
 A former name of Manitoba Health, which governs health policy in Manitoba, Canada